Antonin Ernest d'Avrecourt, also known under the pseudonym Ernest-Georges Petitjean, was a French playwright of the 19th century, mostly known for his comedies and vaudevilles.

His plays, signed under several pseudonyms, were performed on the most important Parisian stages of his time: Théâtre des Variétés, Théâtre du Vaudeville, Théâtre de la Renaissance etc.

Works 
1831: Fifi Lecoq, ou Une visite domiciliaire, anecdote contemporaine, mêlée de couplets, with Philippe-Amédée Roustan
1831: La Future de province, ou les Informations, comédie en vaudevilles in 1 act, with Dumanoir
1833: Poète et maçon, comédie en vaudevilles in 1 act, with Adolphe de Leuven and Eugène Roche
1833 : Le Cadet de famille, vaudeville in 1 act, with Léon Lévy Brunswick and Louis-Émile Vanderburch
1836: Madame Peterhoff, vaudeville anecdote in 1 act, with Charles de Livry
1836: Une spéculation, vaudeville in 1 act, with Dumanoir and E. Roche
1837: Absent et présent, comedy in 1 act, mixed with distincts
1837: L’Épée de mon père, comédie en vaudevilles in 1 act, with Charles Desnoyer
1838: Les parens de la fille, comedy in 1 act and in prose, with Félix Arvers and Ernest-Georges Petitjean
1841: Les Vieilles amours, vaudeville in 1 act, with F. Arvers and Petitjean
1842: Les Ressources de Jonathas, comédie en vaudevilles in 1 act, with Charles Varin
1844 : Les anglais en voyage, vaudeville in one act, with F. Arvers
1848: La Fiancée du prince, comedie en vaudevilles in 3 acts, with Arsène de Cey and Petitjean
1849: Lord Spleen, with Arvers and Petitjean
1850: Le Banquet de camarades, with Arvers and Petitjean
1854: Monsieur de La Palisse, vaudeville in 1 act, with Pierre Carmouche, Eugène Nyon and Petitjean
1857: Le Pot de fer et le pot de terre, vaudeville in 1 act, with Alfred Desroziers and Petitjean
1858: Le Chapitre de la toilette, comedy in 1 act, with Édouard Lafargue and Petitjean
1862: Le Domestique de ma femme, comédie en vaudeville in 1 act, with Lafargue and Petitjean
1862 : Essai sur les institutions romaines sous la République et sous l'Empire
1862 : Étude sur la Pléiade et sur son influence

19th-century French dramatists and playwrights
Year of birth missing
Year of death missing